Kenneth Skelding (25 March 1947 – 13 May 2012) was a South African cricketer. He played in three first-class matches for Border in 1970/71.

See also
 List of Border representative cricketers

References

External links
 

1947 births
2012 deaths
South African cricketers
Border cricketers
People from Loughton